This is a list of inventions by people who were born in Taiwan (officially known as Republic of China) or citizens of Republic of China.

Food, food techniques and cuisine

Bubble tea 
is a drink that contains flavored tea and tapioca pearls. It was invented in the early 1980s in Taiwan. Bubble tea vendors serve the beverage cold or hot inside a translucent plastic cup with an oversized straw wide enough for the tapioca bubbles to pass through. The drink has spread from Taiwan and is now popular across the world.
General Tso's chicken
is a sweet deep-fried chicken dish that is served in North American Chinese restaurants. The recipe was invented by Taiwan-based Hunan cuisine chef Peng Chang-kuei.  
Instant noodles 
 were invented by Go Pek-hok, who later adopted the name Momofuku Ando when he immigrated from Taiwan to Japan. Ando created a method for deep-frying and drying noodles that could later be cooked using boiling water. He founded the Nissin Foods company, which in 1971 introduced instant noodles marketed as Cup Noodles that were packaged in Styrofoam cups. 
Mongolian barbecue 
 is a stir fried dish that was developed by Wu Zhaonan in Taiwan in 1951. Meat and vegetables are cooked on large, round, solid iron griddles at temperatures of up to 300 °C (572 °F). Despite its name, the dish is not Mongolian, and is only loosely related to barbecue.

Games and entertainment
Connect6 
 is a game similar to Gomoku invented by I-Chen Wu, a computer science professor at National Chiao Tung University. The player who obtains six or more stones in a row wins.
Cat café 
 was first opened in Taipei, Taiwan in 1998, which involves a coffee shop with in-house cats that roam freely and interact with customers. The idea since took off and spread around the world.

Science and technology
A universal crossed molecular beam apparatus 
 for studying chemical reactions was developed by the Taiwanese chemist Yuan T. Lee. In 1986, Lee was awarded the Nobel Prize in Chemistry alongside Dudley R. Herschbach and John Polanyi "for their contributions to the dynamics of chemical elementary processes."
Floating gate transistor
 In 1967, Simon Min Sze and Dawon Kahng invented the floating gate transistor, which provides the foundation for many forms of semiconductor memory devices.
Discovering HAART Cocktail Therapy
 David Ho is a Taiwanese-American medical doctor and HIV/AIDS researcher who was born in Taiwan and has made many innovative state of the art scientific contributions to the understanding and technological treatment of HIV infection.
The integrated laptop projector 
 was first developed and showcased by Asus, a Taiwanese computer manufacturer, in 2008. The built-in projector debuted at Computex Taipei 2008, an annual computer expo. Competitors such as HP in 2010 and Fujitsu in 2011 have since released similar products.
N95 mask
 The filtration media used in N95 masks was invented by Peter Tsai.
The optimistic concurrency control 
 method was first proposed by Taiwanese computer scientist H. T. Kung and American John T. Robinson in 1981.

USB flash drive
 a data storage device, invented by Pua Khein-Seng, a Taiwanese-Malaysian inventor.
Xiaoluren
 the walking green man, is the animated traffic light system.
High entropy alloys
 invented in 2004 by Jien-Wei Yeh and his team in Taiwan.
WiMAX
a wireless broadband communication standards invented by Tatung Company accompanied with Tatung University.

Language and writing system
Taiwan Sign Language
 is the sign language most commonly used by the deaf and hard of hearing in Taiwan.
Taiwanese Braille
 is the braille script used in Taiwan for Taiwanese Mandarin (Guoyu).

Sports
Woodball 
 is a sport invented by Weng Ming-hui and Kuang-chu Young in 1990. In the game, a mallet is used to pass a ball through a series of gates. The Olympic Council of Asia made the sport a program of the Asian Beach Games in 2008. The International Woodball Federation is based in Taipei, Taiwan.

Weapons and military

Assault rifle 
 XT-97 Assault Rifle
 T91 assault rifle
 T86 assault rifle
 T65 assault rifle

Sniper rifle 
 T93 sniper rifle

Submachine gun 
 Type 77 submachine gun

Machine gun 
 T74 Machine Gun
 T75 Light machine gun

Pistol 
 T75 pistol

Grenade launcher 
 Kestrel

Others 
 XTR-101/102
 CS/MPQ-90 Bee Eye

See also
 History of typography in East Asia
 List of Chinese discoveries
 List of Chinese inventions
 List of Japanese inventions and discoveries
 List of Korean inventions and discoveries

References

 
Taiwan
Taiwan inventions
Inventions and discoveries